Pawan Kumar (born 19 September 1970) is an Indian former cricketer. He played first-class cricket for Andhra and Hyderabad in 1993/94.

See also
 List of Hyderabad cricketers

References

External links
 

1970 births
Living people
Indian cricketers
Andhra cricketers
Hyderabad cricketers
People from Eluru
Cricketers from Andhra Pradesh